Kenneth G. McMillan (born September 7, 1942) is an American politician and educator.

Politics
McMillan served as a Republican member of the Illinois State Senate from 1977 to 1983. McMillan ran for U.S. Congress in 1982 on a conservative platform and defeated moderate Republican incumbent Tom Railsback. At the time, his state senate district covered much of the western portion of the congressional district. McMillan however lost in the general election to Democratic challenger Lane Evans by 6%, McMillan again ran against Evans in 1984 but lost by 14%. In 1988, McMillan then attempted a political comeback by running for an open seat in the Illinois House of Representatives, but was defeated by Democratic candidate Bill Edley in the Republican leaning district.

Background
Born in Macomb, Illinois, McMillan grew up on a farm near Walnut Grove, Illinois (both communities are in McDonough County). He went to Bushnell-Prairie High School. McMillan received his bachelor's degree in agriculture and his master's degree in agricultural economics from University of Illinois. He served as an aide and speechwriter for members of Congress and was involved with agricultural issues. McMillan lived in Bushnell, Illinois. He is currently a professor of political economy and commerce at Monmouth College, a liberal arts college in Monmouth, Illinois.

References

1942 births
Living people
People from Macomb, Illinois
People from McDonough County, Illinois
University of Illinois alumni
Monmouth College faculty
Republican Party Illinois state senators
People from Bushnell, Illinois